Sokole may refer to the following places:
Sokole, Pomeranian Voivodeship (north Poland)
Sokole, Człuchów County in Pomeranian Voivodeship
Sokole, Podlaskie Voivodeship (north-east Poland)
Sokóle, Podlaskie Voivodeship (north-east Poland)
Sokóle, Masovian Voivodeship (east-central Poland)